Russ Adams (July 30, 1930 – June 28, 2017) was an American photographer.  He was called by his peers the "dean" of modern tennis photography. In a Boston Globe profile (July 12, 2007) of Russ Adams regarding his July 2007 induction into the International Tennis Hall of Fame in Newport, Rhode Island, Billie Jean King stated: "Russ is a national treasure."  "He's our dean, our guru, our guardian. Believe me, the players look for him and love him,"  King added.

He covered the sport for 50 years and created associated tennis photography rules.  He was inducted into the International Tennis Hall of Fame in Newport, Rhode Island in July 2007 along with players Pete Sampras, Arantxa Sánchez Vicario, and Sven Davidson.

Adams spent the last 50 years of his life visually documenting the history of tennis at over 400 events.  He is the face behind the camera and his work has illuminated the greatest moments and stories in the sport.

Adams photographed Grand Slam Tournaments, the World Championship Tour (WCT), all major United States Tennis Association (USTA) tournaments, Fed Cup, Davis Cup, and tennis at the Olympic Games.  Watch  five video vignettes about the Australian Open that show Russ and highlight his work, produced and aired by The Tennis Channel, that ran on TV during this year's tournament.

Adams credited learning tennis photographer from 17-time Grand Slam Champion, the "Queen Mother of American Tennis," Hazel Wightman, at Longwood Cricket Club in Chestnut Hill, MA, where Wightman was a member.

In 1967 he became the official (volunteer) photographer of the U.S. National Championship at Forest Hills.  At the birth of Open Tennis he developed and implemented the system for on-court photographers at the 1969 U.S. Open Championship in tandem with the tournament director Bill Talbert.

He served as director/liaison of photographers for the U.S. Open, and was instrumental in developing the universal "Code of Conduct" in conjunction with the Professional Tennis Council to be used by photographers covering tennis events around the world.

He was a founding member of the International Tennis Federation Media Commission and served on the Board for 17 years.

Adams's collection of tennis images was considered the largest privately held source of images in the tennis world.  "His portfolio of photos is probably the most comprehensive volume chronicling the game of tennis from its professional infancy," stated fellow International Tennis Hall of Famer Jim Courier in a Northeast Tennis Magazine (Summer 2007) cover profile of Adams.

Adams died on June 28, 2017, at age 86.

Awards

References

External links 
 International Tennis Hall of Fame
 Source of Adams learning tennis photography 
 Russ Adams' tips article in USTA Magazine

1930 births
2017 deaths
Tennis mass media
American photojournalists
International Tennis Hall of Fame inductees